Kál is a large village in Heves County, Hungary. As of 2015, it has a population of 3,519, and 3,359 as of the 2021 estimate.

History
The earliest written record of the village dates back to 1331, and was already inhabited before the Hungarian conquest.

Demographics
According the 2011 census, 81.0% of the population were of Hungarian ethnicity, 10.8% were Gypsies, and 18.8% were undeclared (due to dual identities, the total may be higher than 100%). The religious distribution was as follows: 56.8% Roman Catholic, 1.7% Calvinist, 9.9% non-denominational, and 19.5% unknown.

References

External links

  in Hungarian

Populated places in Heves County